Monique Fessl (* May 2, 1974 in St.Lorenzen/Mürztal) is an Austrian music producer, composer, Techno – DJ, singer and media artist.

Life and work 
The acute examination for own compositions begins 1995. The first release with her band "Back to Godhead", a classical guitar band formation, wins at the Austrian SKYPE CONTEST and made the second place Europe-wide. This is followed by further releases in different formations and genres between Indie Rock and Elektro-Pop. In 2003 Monique Fessl is nominated for the Austrian "Amadeus Award" with the band-project Nimai (with Gregor Henning and Volker Pflüger).

Since 2006 Monique Fessl is working solo. The style focuses on electronic music and Techno, combined with her melodic vocals. Releases are published on labels like TONGUT(Switzerland), Monomental digital (Hannover), Futureaudio (Hamburg) or Zeiger records (Graz), featuring the 2008 FM4 hit "Schnee mit Matsch".

In 2014 she released a remix of the single "The Violets" from the Austrian electronic musician "Favela Gold".

In 2015 Monique Fessl is working on a new production in cooperation with the Swiss artist Apoll (TONGUT), which will be released in August 2015.

Monique Fessl has a master's degree in Astrophysics at the Karl Franzens University Graz, Austria, and a degree for media- and interaction design at the University of Applied Sciences Joanneum Graz. She is a member of female pressure, an international data-base for female Djs, music producers and artists, having been founded by Susanne Kirchmayr (DJ Electric Indigo).

Discografie 

LPs
 1998: Icecream for Love (with Back to Godhead)
 1999: Play me (with Shuka)
 2002: Fallen from a Star (with Nimai)
EPs
 2008: Who knows, Tongut
Singles
2014: The Violets (Monique Fessl Remix), Favela Gold
Compilations
 1996: Springtime, Shelter, Jaya Radha-Madhava, Desaster Area, Promotion-Sampler
 1999: Sugar Candy Mountain, Dream, pop 37,38, pop!platte
 1999: Sugar Candy Mountain, Austrian Sound Odyssey, projekt pop!, AKM, IFPI Austria, SR – Archiv Österreichischer Popularmusik
 2001: The Lovesong, Soundtrack Ikarus, monkey music
 2002: One Love, FM4 Soundpark, VWSF-03/02
 2003: What, When, If, Is?, Nibblingontheloops, Sevenahalf
 2008: Let loose (mit Willi Gangster), Soundtrack Schlimmer geht's nimmer
 2008: The Love Track (Apoll Re-Loved), Konform, Tongut
 2008: Schnee mit Match, Styrian Stylez, Zeiger Records
 2009: About it we are silent (Remix), Sozonov, Compilation Elevate, Zero inch, Kangaroo
 2009: The Love Track (Apoll Re-Loved), Minimal Techno Vol. 7, futuraudio Records
 2009: Im Augenblick (mit Martin Mathy), Styrian Stylez, Zeiger Records
 2011: Crater (Sozonov ft. Monique Fessl), Felerica
 2012: Komm Gib Mir Deine Hand (guestmusician), Jugend, Binder & Krieglstein), earcandy recordings
Live sets
 2015-04-08 Eröffnungskonzert Ausstellung "Desiring the real.Austria contemporary", Club OnStage, Shanghai/China mit Dorit Chrysler
 2015-03-19 sound:frame – "Departures: Austrian Days“, Pilsen – Europäische Kulturhauptstadt
 2015, Tschechien mit Bernhard Fleischmann und Sixtus Preiss

External links 
 Monique Fessl Official homepage
 monique fessl at discogs http://www.discogs.com/search/?q=monique+fessl&type=all
 http://www.sra.at/band/14765
 http://www.sra.at/band/18841
 http://www.sra.at/band/45622
 female:pressure an international data-base for female Djs, music producers and artists

Austrian artists
1974 births
Living people